Antti-Jussi Juntunen (born 6 April 1999) is a Finnish racing cyclist, who currently rides for UCI Continental team . In August 2020, he won the Finnish National Road Race Championships.

Career
Juntunen was introduced to cycling by his father, who ran a local cycling club, and his brother, who was also a cyclist. He rode for French development team Remy Meder Haguenau as a junior, before moving to Estonian team  for the 2020 season. In 2020, he won the Finnish National Road Race Championships.

Major results

2016
 1st  Time trial, National Junior Road Championships
2019
 National Under-23 Road Championships
1st  Road race
2nd Time trial
 National Road Championships
5th Road race
5th Time trial
2020
 National Road Championships
1st  Road race
3rd Time trial
 3rd Carpathian Couriers Race
 10th Overall Dookoła Mazowsza
2021
 1st Stage 4 Dookoła Mazowsza
 3rd Road race, National Road Championships
 3rd Overall Baltic Chain Tour
 4th GP Slovenian Istria
 6th Memoriał Henryka Łasaka
 7th Overall Tour of Estonia
1st  Young rider classification
 9th Poreč Trophy
 10th Overall Kreiz Breizh Elites

References

External links
 

1999 births
Living people
Finnish male cyclists
Sportspeople from Vantaa